A khanate is a state under the rule of a khan ("ruler" in Mongolic and Turkic languages). 

Khanate can also refer to:
Khanate (band), an American metal band
Khanate (album), the band's self-titled first album